

Tajikistan

Tanzania

Thailand

Togo

Tunisia

Turkey

Turkmenistan

Uganda

Ukraine

United Arab Emirates

United Kingdom

United States

Uruguay

Uzbekistan

Venezuela

Vietnam

Western Sahara

Yemen

Zambia

Zimbabwe

See also
 World largest cities

References

2014 United Nations Demographic Yearbook (Table 8: Population of capital cities and cities of 100,000 or more inhabitants: latest available year, 1995 - 2014) United Nations Statistics Division, accessed 15 November 2016

Towns and cities with 100,000 or more inhabitants
100,000 or more inhabitants
T